Cirricaecula johnsoni, known commonly as the Fringelip snake eel, is an eel in the family Ophichthidae (worm/snake eels). It was described by Leonard Peter Schultz in 1953. It is a tropical, marine eel which is known from the Rongerik Atoll, Marshall Islands, in the western central Pacific Ocean. Males can reach a maximum total length of 40 centimetres.

Etymology
The fish was named in honor of Dr. Martin Johnson, who was at Scripps Institute of Oceanography in La Jolla, California.

References

Myers, R.F., 1991. Micronesian reef fishes. Second Ed. Coral Graphics, Barrigada, Guam. 298 p.

Ophichthidae
Taxa named by Leonard Peter Schultz
Fish described in 1953